The Dewar Shield is a rugby union competition in Melbourne. It is the professional and semi-professional premier grade for rugby in Victoria. A total of nine teams from the Victorian Rugby Union compete for the trophy. Local TV Channel 31 broadcasts one game a week on Wednesday evenings. The Rebel Army periodically have online text-based commentary of matches.

History

The Victorian Rugby Union senior competition was established in 1909 with five teams, namely East Melbourne, Melbourne, South Melbourne, St Kilda and University. The Melbourne Rugby Club of that time won the first year of the five-team competition for the new trophy the Dewar Shield (donated by the Scotch Whisky Distillery John Dewar and Sons). One hundred years later in 2009 the current Melbourne Rugby Club is the reigning premiers, defeating Box Hill in the Grand Final for the same Dewar Shield.

The Premier competition is contested by nine clubs with each club fielding three teams (Premier 1, Premier 2, and Premier 3). Other senior competitions offered are Metro 2nd Division with an A, B & C Grade, Colts (U20), Country, Women and Masters (over 35s).

During this time, a number of clubs have dominated the 1st Grade results. Melbourne Rugby Club has the most number of Premierships with 17. Moorabbin holds the record for consecutive Premierships, winning six in a row from 1981 to 1986. Other prominent clubs during this 100-year period include Melbourne University, Power House and Navy.

Footscray and Endeavour Hills were promoted to the Premier division for the 2011 season.

Premier Division clubs

Dewar Shield winners
Victorian Rugby Union Premiership winners (from 1946 onwards):

Former Premier Division clubs
(list may not be complete)
 East Melbourne
 South Melbourne
 St Kilda
 Hawthorn
 Kiwi
 Navy 
 R.A.A.F
 Boroondara/Kiwi-Hawthorna
 South Melbourne
 Southern Districts RUC
 Geelong
 Northcote/Northern

a Kiwi-Hawthorn now play in the Second Division A competition.

See also

Victorian Rugby Union
Melbourne Rebels
List of oldest rugby union competitions
List of Australian club rugby union competitions

References

External links
Dewar Shield webpage on Melbourne Rebels official site

Club websites

Box Hill RUFC
Endeavour Hills RUFC
Footscray RUC
Harlequin RUC
Melbourne RUFC

Melbourne University RFC
Moorabbin RUFC
Power House RUFC

Rugby union competitions in Victoria
Sports competitions in Melbourne
Recurring sporting events established in 1909
1909 establishments in Australia
Sports leagues established in 1909